Call My Name is the sixth studio album by American blues artist, Etta James. The album was produced by Leonard Chess and released on Cadet Records in 1967.

Call My Name was the second of a series of albums James would release that mainly consisted on Soul music. It included one song that charted on Rhythm and Blues chart, "I Prefer You," that reached #42. The other two singles spawned from the release ("Don't Pick Me for Your Fool" and "Call My Name") did not chart, becoming James's first album that did not release a Top 40 single. Allmusic gave the album four out of five stars, calling the tracks, "I'm So Glad (I Found Love in You)," "It Must Be Your Love," and "Don't Pick Me for Your Fool" as "standouts." The album was released on a 12-inch vinyl LP record, consisting of twelve tracks, with six songs on each side of the album. It has been available as a CD volume since 2011 when reissued with additional tracks by Kent records

Track listing
Side one
"Happiness" (Vee Pea Smith, Morris Dollison)
"That's All I Want from You" (M. Rotha)
"Have a Little Faith in Me" (Monk Higgins, Joyce Wrencher)
"I'm So Glad (I Found Love in You)" (Vee Pea Smith, Morris Dollison)
"You Are My Sunshine" (Jimmie Davis, Charles Mitchell)
"It Must Be Your Love" (Monk Higgins, Chuck Bernard, Morris Dollison, Billy Foster)

Side two
"842-3089 (Call My Name)" (Monk Higgins, Morris Dollison, Billy Foster)
"Don't Pick Me for Your Fool" (Monk Higgins, Morris Dollison, Billy Foster)
"I Prefer You" (Monk Higgins, Morris Dollison)
"Nobody Loves Me" (Monk Higgins, Joyce Wrencher)
"It's All Right" (Curtis Mayfield)
"Nobody Like You" (Monk Higgins, Morris Dollison)

Charts
Singles - Billboard (United States)

References

1967 albums
Etta James albums
Cadet Records albums
Albums produced by Leonard Chess